Birwahi is a village in Devendranagar tehsil, Panna District, Madhya Pradesh, India.

Sources
 Madhya Pradesh RTE Portal: Schools in Birwahi / Devendranagar
 Bundelkhand.in: Village list for Panna District

Villages in Panna district